Flaxton is a small village and civil parish in the Ryedale district of North Yorkshire, England. It is close to the A64 between York and Malton. The village lies entirely within a Conservation Area as defined by Planning (Listed Building and Conservation Areas Act) 1990.

History

The village is mentioned in the Domesday Book as Flaxtune in the Bulford hundred. At that time it was part of  the manor of Foston and was in the possession of Earl Morcar, but passed to Count Alan of Brittany by 1086. The etymology of the name is taken from Old English meaning settlement where flax is made.

In 1807 a lead box containing around 300 Saxon silver coins was discovered in a field near the village.

Flaxton was served by Flaxton railway station on the York to Scarborough Line between 1845 and 1930.

Governance

The village lies within the Thirsk and Malton (UK Parliament constituency). It is also within the Hovingham & Sheriff Hutton electoral division of North Yorkshire County Council and the Sheriff Hutton ward of Ryedale District Council.

Geography

The nearest settlements to the village are Claxton  to the south; West Lilling  to the north-west; Harton  to the east and Thornton-le-Clay  to the north-east.

The 1881 UK Census recorded the population as 366. According to the 2001 UK Census, the village had a population of 331, of which 255 were over the age of sixteen. Of these, 168 were in employment. There were 138 dwellings, of which 86 were detached. The 2011 Census showed a population of 343.

The village areas around Flaxton Village Green and the Crofts are designated Sites of Importance for Nature Conservation (SINCs). Here can be found semi-improved and unimproved neutral grassland, as well as wet grassland on the Keld with three ponds that include two great crested newt breeding sites.

It has one pub, the Thompson Arms Inn, and a B&B, the Blacksmiths Arms.

Education

In 1867 a Church of England school was built in the village. It was built by Thomas Abbey of Claxton on land donated by Thomas Richard Smith and paid for with money raised by the Rector and parishioners. The clock is by Potts of Leeds and dates to the end of the 19th-century.

The school closed in 1987 and was listed as a Grade II building in 2011 as an unusual surviving example of school for poorer children which pre-dates the 1870 Education Act.

The village is now within the education catchment areas of Sand Hutton primary school and Huntington School, York.

Religion

The village has a church dedicated to St Lawrence, which was built in 1853 in the 13th-century Gothic style and replaced an earlier chapel. The church was declared a rectory in 1867 before which time it had been a perpetual curacy.

The lychgate was erected as a memorial after the First World War.

References

External links

Villages in North Yorkshire
Civil parishes in North Yorkshire